Bar Bar is a village in Hakimabad Rural District, in the Central District of Zarandieh County, Markazi Province, Iran. At the 2006 census, its population was 523, in 134 families. According to Census 2011 information the location code or village code of Bar Bar village is 104268. Bar Bar village is located in Jhalrapatan Tehsil of Jhalawar district in Rajasthan, India. It is situated 24 km away from sub-district headquarter Jhalrapatan and 32 km away from district headquarter Jhalawar. As per 2009 stats, Barbar is the gram panchayat of Bar Bar village.

The total geographical area of village is 237.86 hectares. Bar Bar has a total population of 1,043 peoples. There are about 280 houses in Bar Bar village. As per 2019 stats, Bar Bar villages comes under Khanpur assembly & Jhalawar-Baran parliamentary constituency. Jhalrapatan is nearest town to Bar Bar which is approximately 24 km away.

References 

Populated places in Zarandieh County